The 2021 Norwegian Women's Cup was the 44th season of the Norwegian annual knock-out football tournament. It began on 3 August 2021 and ended with the final on 31 October 2021.

Vålerenga won the competition for the second year in a row after beating Sandviken in the final.

First round
10 teams from 1. divisjon and 34 teams from 2. divisjon entered the first round. All Toppserien teams received a bye in this round.

|colspan="3" style="background-color:#97DEFF"|3 August 2021

|-
|colspan="3" style="background-color:#97DEFF"|4 August 2021

|-
|colspan="3" style="background-color:#97DEFF"|5 August 2021

|}

Second round
The second round consists of 10 teams from Toppserien, 9 teams from 1. divisjon and 13 teams from 2. divisjon.

|colspan="3" style="background-color:#97DEFF"|10 August 2021

|-
|colspan="3" style="background-color:#97DEFF"|11 August 2021

|-
|colspan="3" style="background-color:#97DEFF"|17 August 2021

|}

Third round
The draw for the third round was made on 13 August 2021.

Quarter-finals
The draw for the quarter-finals was made on 26 August 2021.

Semi-finals
The draw for the semi-finals was made on 13 September 2021. The semi-finals were played between the top four teams in the 2021 Toppserien.

Final

Top scorers

References

Norwegian Women's Cup seasons
Norwegian Women's Cup
Cup
Norwegian Women's Cup, 2021